Allen Edward Barrow (January 22, 1914 – February 26, 1979) was a United States district judge of the United States District Court for the Northern District of Oklahoma.

Education and career
Born in Okemah, Oklahoma, Barrow received a Bachelor of Arts degree from the University of Oklahoma in 1937 and a Bachelor of Laws from Southeastern State College (now Southeastern Oklahoma State University) in 1942. He was in the United States Army during World War II from 1942 to 1946, and achieved the rank of major. He then entered private practice in Tulsa, Oklahoma from 1946 to 1951. He was assistant chief counsel and acting chief counsel of the Southwestern Power Administration of the United States Department of the Interior in Tulsa from 1951 to 1954, then returned to private practice of law in Tulsa until 1962.

Federal judicial service

On July 18, 1962, Barrow was nominated by President John F. Kennedy to a seat on the United States District Court for the Northern District of Oklahoma vacated by Judge Royce H. Savage. He was confirmed by the United States Senate on August 1, 1962, and received his commission on August 2, 1962.

Barrow served as Chief Judge from 1962 until his death on February 26, 1979.

References

Sources
 

1914 births
1979 deaths
University of Oklahoma alumni
Southeastern Oklahoma State University alumni
People from Okemah, Oklahoma
Judges of the United States District Court for the Northern District of Oklahoma
United States district court judges appointed by John F. Kennedy
20th-century American judges
United States Army officers
20th-century American lawyers